Trego (also Mills, Superior Junction) is an unincorporated census-designated place located in the town of Trego, Washburn County, Wisconsin, United States.

Trego has a post office with ZIP code 54888. As of the 2010 census, its population is 227.

History
Trego, supposedly meaning "three ways", was so named from its location at a rail junction.

References

Census-designated places in Washburn County, Wisconsin
Census-designated places in Wisconsin